Nan'ao Township is a mountain indigenous township in the southern part of Yilan County, Taiwan. It is the largest township in the county.

History
The township was formerly the "Aboriginal Area" of Suō District, Taihoku Prefecture during Japanese rule. It was the site of the Sayun incident made famous through the movie Sayon's Bell.

Geography

The population consists mainly of the indigenous Atayal people. Many residents of Aohua Village still speak the Japanese language in daily life.

Nan'ao Township contains part of the mountainous terrain of the Central Mountain Range.
 Area: 740.65 km²
 Population: 6,105 people in 1902 households (February 2023)

Administrative divisions
Nanao is divided into seven villages (from north to south):
 Dongyue
 Nan'ao
 Biho
 Jinyue
 Wuta
 Jinyang
 Aohua

Tourist attractions
 Cueifong Lake

Transportation

Nan'ao is served by the North-Link Line of Taiwan Railway Administration at three stations: Dong'ao Station, Hanben Station, and Wuta Station.

Taiwan Highway 9 passes through Nan'ao. Between Su'ao and Hualien City, to the south, this road is known as the Suhua Highway (蘇花公路), and it features some of the most dramatic oceanside scenery in Taiwan.

Notable natives
 Laha Mebow, writer, producer and director

References

External links

  

Townships in Yilan County, Taiwan